Batna or BATNA may refer to:
Batna (city), Algeria
Batna Province, Algeria
Best alternative to a negotiated agreement
Mourad Batna, Moroccan football player

See also 
Al Bāţinah (disambiguation)

pl:Batina